Spallumcheen is a district municipality in the Canadian province of British Columbia. The district, whose official name is the Township of Spallumcheen and which is the oldest rural municipality in the British Columbia Interior (incorporated in 1892), consists primarily of agricultural land surrounding the separately incorporated City of Armstrong. Both Spallumcheen and Armstrong are member municipalities of the Regional District of North Okanagan.

Etymology
The name is derived from a Shuswap language word, either "spil-a-mi-shine" meaning "flat mouth", or "spal-lum-shin" meaning "meadow flat".  Another word, spalmtsin, which has an Okanagan language cognate spelemtsin, means "flat area along edge".  Other variations include Spellmacheen and Spallamcheen, which were the original names used for the Shuswap River, which exits the Shuswap Highland in this area and heads north to Mara and Shuswap Lakes. The same word is the source of the name of the Spillimacheen River and the settlement of the same name in the Columbia Valley.

Demographics 

Ethnicity

Religion 
According to the 2021 census, religious groups in Spallumcheen included:
Irreligion (2,925 persons or 55.1%)
Christianity (2,315 persons or 43.6%)
Catholic (345 persons or 6.5%)
United Church (215 persons or 4.1%)
Baptist (135 persons or 2.5%)
Reformed (110 persons or 2.1%)
Anabaptist (65 persons or 1.2%)
Lutheran (65 persons or 1.2%)
Other Christian (1,380 persons or 26.0%)
Other (50 persons or 0.9%)

See also
Spallumcheen Indian Band

Notes

References

External links

District municipalities in British Columbia
Populated places in the Okanagan Country
Populated places in the Regional District of North Okanagan